Charles Brammall Dolphin (March 3, 1888 – June 28, 1969) was a British-Canadian architect who designed various buildings in Toronto,  most notably the Toronto Postal Delivery Building (now incorporated into the Scotiabank Arena).

Born in Ashton-under-Lyne, England, Dolphin immigrated to Canada.

He was married to Doris Alexandrine Stovel and had several children: William (died as infant), Flight Lieutenant Douglas Dolphin, RCAF (d. 1944) and Nancy Jane Dolphin (1937–2002), Robert Dolphin and Shirley Dolphin.

He died in Toronto in 1969.

Portfolio
 William McBrien Building (1900 Yonge Street) 1957–1958 – International Style office tower
 Toronto Postal Delivery Building 1947 – most of original Art Deco was building demolished with only portions of the south & east facades remaining
 The Clarendon (2 Clarendon Avenue) 1926–1927 – Tudor Revival apartments
 Bloor-Yonge (TTC) subway station (20 Bloor Street East) 1954
 Consumers Gas Showroom (2532 Yonge Street) 1930–1932 Art Deco building restored by ERA Architects.
 Arthur Meighen Building (Postal Station Q 25 St Clair Ave East) 1954
 Toronto Coach Terminal (610 Bay Street) 1931–1932; altered 1990 
 St. Andrew's Presbyterian Church, Port Credit (24 Stavenbank Road) 1926–1927
 Toronto Ski Club clubhouse (near 11901 Yonge Street), Richmond Hill, Ontario 1930

Personal
Dolphin was married to Doris Alexandrine LeGendre Stovel had several children (Nancy Jane Dolphin (1937–2002), William Dolphin, Flight Lieutenant Douglas Dolphin (d. 1944), Robert Dolphin and Shirley Dolphin).

References

1888 births
1969 deaths
Canadian architects
20th-century English architects
People from Ashton-under-Lyne
British emigrants to Canada